Kabri (also transliterated Cabri) is a kibbutz in northern Israel.

The kibbutz is located on lands which used to belong to  the depopulated Palestinian villages  of  Al-Kabri and al-Nahr.

History

Prehistory

The area of Kabri springs was first settled 16,000 years ago , during the Neolithic period. Permanent structures appeared around the year 10000 BCE . Archaeological digs uncovered the remains of an ancient city.

The ancient city that existed 1 km to the south-west is known to archaeologists as Tel Kabri, though its Canaanite name  is not known. It was a city-state in the heart of which was placed the palace of the ruling monarch. The two-story palace was decorated with colorful frescoes and ornaments in Minoan style.  Residents of the city (their number is estimated at 5,000) earned their living through agriculture and international commerce. Leftover bits and pieces of merchandise whose origins lay in Egypt, Turkey and Crete were found in the ruins and in graves during the excavations. The city was connected to a port on the coast, apparently the one under Achziv. The city-state was completely abandoned around the year 1600 BCE for unknown reasons.

Ancient history

That settlement survived from the 9th century BCE until the end of 7th century, at which time it was destroyed by the Babylonians.

Modern history
The Palestinian village of al-Kabri existed at the site from the post-Crusader period until 1949. In 1948 the Yehiam convoy was ambushed while passing the village. According to Israeli historian Benny Morris, a subsequent Haganah attack led to the flight of most of the villagers, while others were killed in what became known as the al-Kabri incident. The Haganah planned to "destroy and burn" Al-Kabri and neighboring villages in the western Galilee. Later, Al-Kabri was among villages razed to ensure that its residents "could and would never return."

In 1949 a new kibbutz was founded on the site of the village by displaced members of kibbutz Beit HaArava and young refugees from the Youth Aliyah. Beit HaArava was located along the Jordan River near Jericho, and had been evacuated during the 1948 Arab–Israeli War, was subsequently destroyed by the invading Jordanian forces. Beit HaArava's children and noncombatant women members had been evacuated to kibbutz Shefayim during the War of Independence. The members subsequently divided in 1949 into two groups. One became the founding members of Kabri and the other joined Gesher HaZiv, another kibbutz in the Western Galilee.

Geography
The kibbutz is situated near four natural springs, which provide water to it and the neighboring moshavim of Ben Ami and Nativ HaShayara. There are also two archeological sites within its boundaries: Tel Kabri and a Byzantine well and mosaic floor. It commands a view of the Mediterranean and is within sight of the Lebanese border.

Economy
The kibbutz supports itself from a successful banana plantation and from the avocado groves where most of the archaeological excavation has taken place by the ongoing archaeological expedition at Tel Kabri. The kibbutz also runs a metal and wax casting factory (Cabiran), a plastics factory (Ri'on), a restaurant, regional auditorium, and a vacation village.

Educational institutions
Two schools are located on the kibbutz grounds—the "Maayanot" regional elementary school and the "Manor-Kabri" regional high school—in which children and youth of the kibbutz and nearby settlements receive their education. The high school particularly emphasizes education in the arts, offering majors (Grades 10–12) in music, visual arts, drama, and cinema/video. Owing to the educational programs offered in the performing arts along with academic subjects from the state curriculum, it attracts pupils from all over the area. Former Knesset member and Kabri resident Daniel Rosolio taught at both schools.

There is also a childcare system for infants, toddlers, and kindergartners, and adult education with a range of cultural activities.

Notable people
 Yardena Arazi, singer and entertainer
 Avishai Cohen, jazz bassist, composer, singer and arranger
 Eival Gilady, general
 Ori Reisman, painter 
 Daniel Rosolio, politician and member of the Knesset
Aviva Rabinovich-Vin (אביבה רבינוביץ'-וין), professor of botany, chief scientist at the Israel Nature and Parks Authority  and an environmental activist, lived and was buried here

References

External links
Kibbutz website

Kibbutzim
Kibbutz Movement
Populated places established in 1949
Populated places in Northern District (Israel)
1949 establishments in Israel